Andrée Fauré (1904–1985) was a French ceramist and designer. 

Fauré was part of the family business Atelier Fauré that produced ceramic works, located in Limoges, France. Her father Camille Fauré was a noted ceramist.

Her work is included in the collections of the Museum of Fine Arts Houston the Minneapolis Institute of Arts, the Museum für Angewandte Kunst, Leipzig, and the Kirkland Museum of Fine & Decorative Art.

References

1904 births
1985 deaths
20th-century ceramists
20th-century French women artists